Bradley Shaw (born 13 February 1983 in Christchurch) is a field hockey player from New Zealand, who earned his first cap for the national team, nicknamed The Black Sticks, in 2004 at the Champions Trophy against the Netherlands. He competed for New Zealand at the 2008 Summer Olympics in Beijing, the 2012 Summer Olympics in London and the 2006 Commonwealth Games in Melbourne and the 2014 Commonwealth Games in Glasgow, where New Zealand narrowly missed out on a bronze medal, losing a shoot out to England. He scored the winning goal against Argentina in the 2008 Olympic qualifying tournament.

His older brother Hayden Shaw also plays in the national team.

International Senior tournaments
 2005 – Sultan Azlan Shah Cup, Kuala Lumpur
 2006 – Commonwealth Games
 2006 – World Cup
 2007 – Champions Challenge
 2008 – Olympic Games

References

External links
 

1983 births
Living people
New Zealand male field hockey players
Olympic field hockey players of New Zealand
Field hockey players at the 2008 Summer Olympics
Field hockey players at the 2012 Summer Olympics
Field hockey players at the 2016 Summer Olympics
2006 Men's Hockey World Cup players
Commonwealth Games medallists in field hockey
Commonwealth Games bronze medallists for New Zealand
Field hockey players at the 2006 Commonwealth Games
Field hockey players at the 2010 Commonwealth Games
Field hockey players at the 2014 Commonwealth Games
Field hockey players from Christchurch
Medallists at the 2010 Commonwealth Games